Miss Denmark 2022 was the 9th edition of the Miss Denmark pageant, was held on August 28, 2022 at Grand Sierra Resort in Copenhagen. Sara Langtved of Københavns Amt crowned her successor Malou Peters of Storstrøm at the end of the event. The winner will represent Denmark at the upcoming Miss Universe 2022 and Miss Supranational 2023 pageants. The selected Miss World Denmark will participate in the Miss World 2022 while the three runner-ups will participate at the Miss International 2022, Miss Grand International 2022, and the Miss Earth 2022.

Results
These were the results of the 2022 edition of Miss Denmark.

Placements

§ – Voted into Top 15 through the online vote

Special awards

Candidates 
These are the contestants that will be competing for the title.

References

External links 

 Miss Danmark Official Website

Miss Denmark
2022 beauty pageants